The Moors Valley Railway is a  narrow gauge passenger railway, in the Moors Valley Country Park at Ashley Heath, Dorset, England near Ringwood in Hampshire.  There are 20 steam engines and 2 diesel engines. The railway is fully signalled, with two signal boxes, one in a Great Western Railway style and one in a British Rail Southern Region style.  The latter box also contains a mini lever frame and push button panel, for the control of the Lakeside area. The railway was constructed at its present location in 1985/86 and opened to the public in July 1986, after the closure in 1985 of its predecessor at Tucktonia in nearby Christchurch, which had run since 1979.

Moors Valley uses a narrow gauge prototype to produce tank engines in which one may sit, allowing running during the harshest of conditions, so much so that it runs throughout the year. A further benefit of the style of locomotives built to this prototype is that, unlike models, and standard gauge 7 inch locomotives, the locomotives used on the Moors Valley Railway are considerably more powerful due to the increased boiler size that can be achieved through almost freelance prototypes.

Roger Marsh was a pioneer of this principle and built Tinkerbell; when this was spotted a tank locomotive, Talos, was ordered and so started the Tinkerbell-class of locomotives. Coincidentally, when Tinkerbell was seen for sale, it was purchased by the then Tucktonia Railway, becoming its second locomotive. Several more were built at Tucktonia, several far more powerful than previous engines, before everything was moved to Moors Valley Railway.

Moors Valley Railway owns approximately 12 locomotives and a further 7 are privately owned. Hartfield is the most recent addition, being purchased from an owner who rarely used the loco. 'Hartfield' follows the general idea of Jason (a Tinkerbell variation) as per many other private locomotives.

There are many other tender locomotives such as Offa, almost certainly the most powerful 7 inch gauge locomotive in existence until recently.

The carriages at Moors Valley have no roof, but have a bench in the centre to sit on. Each carriage is approximately eight feet long. There are four rakes of eight carriages, in green, brown, olive and red liveries.

Locomotives of the Moors Valley Railway

Special Events
The MVR holds a number of special events throughout the year, showcasing their own, and visiting locomotives.  These events include;

Tinkerbell Weekend
The MVR often hosts a Tinkerbell Weekend, with several visiting engines. The premise of the Tinkerbell Weekend is to gather as many examples of the Tinkerbell-style locomotives as possible at the railway, as it is the home of the "first" Tinkerbell class locomotive. In 2018 Tinkerbell was 50 years old, and the event was held in place of the Autumn gala, in late September to celebrate the engine's anniversary.

Grand Summer Gala
The Grand Summer Gala is the railway's largest event. It features the entire home fleet of locomotives in operation. Alongside the standard passenger trains, demonstration freight trains are run, featuring the railway's large fleet of freight and permanent way stock. The gala also sees the usage of a number of heritage coaches from the Tucktonia railway, albeit not on passenger duties. All of the locomotives in steam take part and follow each other around the track in a parade lap on the Sunday morning.

Other features of the gala include parades of full-size and miniature steam traction engines, a display of classic cars and a model railway exhibition in our carriage sheds.

Autumn Gala
Every year in September, the railway holds an Autumn Gala - smaller than the summer gala - but still with an intensive and varied service. In 2016, the autumn gala was themed to celebrate the railways 30th anniversary.

External links

 Official site

References

7¼ in gauge railways in England
Miniature railways in the United Kingdom